Joe O'Hagan may refer to:

Joseph O'Hagan (1900–1978), British trade union leader
Joe B. O'Hagan (died 2001), Irish Republican Army member